Free at Last is the third studio album from DC Talk, which was released in 1992. Music videos were filmed for "Jesus Is Just Alright", "The Hardway" and "Luv Is A Verb". In 1994, DC Talk released a long-form video of the "Free at Last World Tour" entitled Narrow is the Road, in which all three music videos can be seen.

The album was listed at No. 9 in the 2001 book, CCM Presents: The 100 Greatest Albums in Christian Music and received the Grammy Award for Best Rock Gospel Album (including Best Rock/Contemporary Gospel Album) in 1993. The songs "Socially Acceptable" and "Jesus Is Just Alright" received Dove Awards at the 24th GMA Dove Awards for Rap/Hip Hop Recorded Song of the Year and Rock Recorded Song of the Year respectively. "Luv Is a Verb" received a Dove Award for Rap/Hip Hop Recorded Song of the Year at the 25th GMA Dove Awards.

A special commemorative reissue of this album, including rare tracks and a DVD, was released upon its 10th anniversary.

Track listing
 "Luv Is a Verb" (Toby McKeehan, Mark Heimermann, George Cocchini) – 4:15
 "That Kinda Girl" (McKeehan) – 4:12
 "Greer" – 0:21
 "Jesus Is Just Alright" (Arthur Reid Reynolds) – 4:37
 "Say the Words" (McKeehan, Heimermann) – 5:00
 "WDCT" – 0:43
 "Socially Acceptable" (McKeehan, Heimermann) – 4:57
 "Free at Last" (McKeehan, Joe Hogue) – 4:55
 "Time Is..." (featuring Michael Sweet) (McKeehan, Heimermann, Cocchini) – 4:10
 "The Hardway" (McKeehan) – 5:19
 "2 Honks & a Negro" – 0:18
 "Lean on Me" (Bill Withers) – 5:00
 "Testimony" – 0:44
 "I Don't Want It" (Kevin Max Smith, McKeehan) – 4:14
 "Will Power" – 0:15
 "Word 2 the Father" (McKeehan) – 4:02
 "Jesus Is Just Alright (Reprise)" – 1:00
(10th Anniversary Edition features "The Hardway - Revisited" and look back tracks)

Music videos
"Jesus Is Just Alright"
"The Hardway"
"Luv Is a Verb"

Singles
"Jesus Is Just Alright"
"Socially Acceptable"
"Luv is a Verb"
"The Hardway"
"Say the Words (Now) - (Remix)"

Legacy 
The album is looked at as a turning point in the history of Christian music and has been named one of the greatest albums in the genre. It has been rereleased twice with a tenth anniversary edition in 2002 and a single disc remaster in 2013.

Credits 
DC Talk
 Michael Tait – lead vocals, backing vocals (1, 2, 4, 7, 8, 9, 12, 14, 16)
 Kevin Max – lead vocals, additional backing vocals (1, 7), backing vocals (2, 4, 8, 9, 12, 14)
 TobyMac – rapping (1, 2, 5, 7–10, 14, 16), drum programming (1, 2, 4, 5, 7–10, 12, 14, 16), keyboards (2, 8, 12), bass programming (2, 8, 12), additional programming (2), backing vocals (2, 8, 12, 14, 16)

Musicians

 Mark Heimermann – keyboards (1, 5, 7, 9, 16), drum programming (1, 5, 9), additional backing vocals (1, 5, 7), additional keyboards (4, 10, 14), backing vocals (10, 14)
 Todd Collins – additional programming (1, 5, 7, 9, 10, 14, 16), rapping (1, 4, 5, 7–10, 12, 16), backing vocals (8, 10, 14, 16)
 Phil Madeira – Hammond B3 organ (1, 4, 8), guitar (4), live drums (4)
 Joe Hogue – keyboards (2, 4, 7, 8, 12), bass programming (2, 8, 12), drum programming (2, 4, 7, 8, 12), backing vocals (2, 4, 8, 12), congregation vocals (8)
 Tony Miracle – keyboards (10, 14, 16), drum programming (10, 14)
 Michael Brooks Linney – keyboards (16), drum programming (16)
 Danny Duncan – additional programming (16)
 George Cocchini – guitar (1, 5, 8, 9, 14, 16)
 Micah Wilshire – guitar (2, 12), backing vocals (2), congregation vocals (8)
 Dann Huff – guitar (4, 7, 9)
 Jerry McPherson – guitar (10, 12)
 Jackie Street – bass (1, 5, 9, 14, 16), additional bass (8)
 Wade Jaynes – bass (4)
 John Mark Painter – wah bass (7), string arrangements (7), muted trumpet (10) 
 Mark Douthit – saxophone (1)
 Chris McDonald – trombone (1)
 Mike Haynes – trumpet (1)
 George Tidwell – trumpet (1)
 Kristin Wilkinson – strings (7)
 Teron Carter – rapping (1, 7)
 Stacy Jones – rapping (1, 7)
 Majik – DJ (4, 8)
 Billy Gaines – backing vocals (1, 7, 16)
 Chris Rodriguez – backing vocals (1, 7)
 Chris Willis – backing vocals (1, 2, 7)
 Angelo Petrucci – backing vocals (8)
 Veronica Petrucci – backing vocals (8), guest vocalist (8)
 Michael Sweet – backing vocals (9)
 P.J. Heimermann – backing vocals (10)
 Ken "Scat" Springs – backing vocals (16)
 Raymond Boyd – congregation vocals (8)
 Shirley Durrance – congregation vocals (8)
 Cher Hogue – congregation vocals (8)
 Nyana Parker – congregation vocals (8)
 Michael Quinlan – congregation vocals (8)
 Chris Harris – preacher (8), backing vocals (10)
 Oliver Wells – choir director (8)
 Cindy Butts – choir (8)
 Mary Chapman – choir (8)
 Mancilla Elder – choir (8)
 Mark Elem – choir (8)
 Monica Flair – choir (8)
 Juanita Flemster – choir (8)
 Roberta Higgs – choir (8)
 John Madgett – choir (8)
 Sheila Price – choir (8)
 Dexter M. Redding – choir (8)
 Kimberly Thompson – choir (8)
 Carmen Williams – choir (8)
 Michael Wright – choir (8)

Production

 TobyMac – producer (1–17), art direction
 Mark Heimermann – producer (1, 3–7, 9, 10, 11, 13–17)
 Joe Hogue – producer (2, 8, 12)
 Michael Quinlan – assistant producer (2, 8, 12)
 Dan R. Brock – executive producer
 Eddie DeGarmo – executive producer
 Joe Baldridge – engineer
 Paul Salveson – engineer
 Stephen Stewart-Short – mixing
 Steve Bishir – additional engineer
 Ronnie Brookshire – additional engineer
 Keith Compton – additional engineer
 Lynn Fuston – additional engineer
 Bryan Lenox – additional engineer
 Penn Singleton – additional engineer
 Jeff Coppage – assistant engineer
 Bryan Harden – assistant engineer
 Clark Hook – assistant engineer, mix assistant
 Patrick Kelly – assistant engineer
 Greg Parker – assistant engineer
 Shane D. Wilson – assistant engineer
 Martin Woodlee – assistant engineer, mix assistant
 Amy Hughes – mix assistant
 John Hurley – mix assistant
 Ken Love – mastering at Master Mix, Nashville, Tennessee
 Beth Finch – art coordination
 Lisa Stutts – art coordination
 Michael McGaffin – design and layout
 Judy Northcutt – design and layout
 John Falls – back cover photo, inside photography
 Norman Roy – front cover photo, inside photography

References

DC Talk albums
1992 albums
ForeFront Records albums
Grammy Award for Best Rock Gospel Album